Bright Eyes may refer to:

Music
 Bright Eyes (band), an indie rock group featuring Conor Oberst
 Bright Eyes, an album (and its title track) by Melissa Manchester
 "Bright Eyes" (Art Garfunkel song), 1979, featured on the soundtrack of Watership Down

Television, film, theater
 Bright Eyes (1921 film), directed by Malcolm St. Clair
 Bright Eyes (1929 film), directed by Géza von Bolváry
 Bright Eyes (1934 film), a comedy musical film starring Shirley Temple
 Bright Eyes (musical), a 1910 Broadway comedy with music by Karl Hoschna
 Taylor (Planet of the Apes), a film character nicknamed "Bright Eyes"
 Bright Eyes, a character in the 1986 animated series Pound Puppies
 Bright Eyes, a pony in the TV series My Little Pony Tales

Other
 Susette LaFlesche Tibbles (1854–1903), nicknamed "Bright Eyes", Native American activist and lecturer
 Bright Eyes Sunglasses, an Australian retailer
 Brighteyes, a common name for plants in the genus Reichardia

See also
 Eyebright, a herb